1957 World University Games were held between 31 August and 8 September. They were organised under the direction of Jean Petitjean by the Paris University Club in Paris at their Stadium Charlety. He engaged an American student athlete at the Paris University Club, Martin Feinberg as his assistant. Mr. Petitjean met with and encouraged both eastern and western block Student Sports Federations to participate together; which they did for the first time since the end of World War II.

Sports
  Athletics
  Basketball
  Fencing
  Swimming
  Tennis
  Volleyball
  Water polo

References

 
1957
W
W
World University Games
Multi-sport events in France
World University Games, 1957
World University Games
World University Games
World University Games, 1957